Thomas Witlam Atkinson (1799–1861) was an English architect, artist and traveller in Siberia and Central Asia. Between 1847 and 1853 he travelled over 40 000 miles through Central Asia and Siberia, much of the time together with his wife Lucy and son Alatau, who was born during their travels. He also painted and documented his travels in two books that are today regarded as travel classics. His and Lucy's son, Alatau Tamchiboulac Atkinson, born on 4 November 1848 in what is now Eastern Kazakhstan, was named after the famous Tamshybulak Spring in the town of Qapal at the foot of the Djungar Alatau mountains.

Life
He was born in Cawthorne, near Barnsley, West Riding of Yorkshire in 1799. He began to learn his trade at the age of eight, working alongside his father, who was a stonemason at Cannon Hall, home of the Spencer Stanhope family. By the time he was twenty he was a stone-carver, and in that capacity executed some good work on churches at Barnsley, Ashton-Under-Lyne and elsewhere. At the last-named town he settled for a while as a teacher of drawing. Soon after he became clerk of works to a string of important Victorian architects, including George Basevi, who designed much of Belgrave Square in London.

About this time he devoted himself to the study of Gothic architecture, and in 1829 published a folio volume entitled Gothic Ornaments selected from the different Cathedrals and Churches in England. In 1827, he went to London and established himself as an architect in Upper Stamford Street, Blackfriars. Among his works at this time was the church of St. Nicholas, at Lower Tooting, erected about 1831. A little later he obtained many important commissions in and around Manchester, including the Manchester and Liverpool District Bank in Spring Gardens, in 1834. About 1835, he moved to Manchester, where he began his principal work as an architect, St. Luke's church, Cheetham Hill. This building, designed in a modified perpendicular style, together with his Italian villas and other structures, had a marked effect in improving the architectural taste of the district. He remained at Manchester until 1840, when he fell into debt, an occupational hazard in those days for an architect. He continued to exhibit drawings and paintings at the Royal Academy.

At some point after 1840 he travelled out to India, producing paintings of subjects in Greece, India, Ethiopia, present-day Iran and India itself. Returning to London,  in 1842 he went to Hamburg, then to Berlin, and lastly, in 1846, to St. Petersburg, where he abandoned architecture as a profession for the pursuits of a traveller and artist.

On the advice of Alexander von Humboldt, he turned his attention to Oriental Russia, and, having received a remarkable blank passport from Nicholas I of Russia, he set out in January 1847 on the first of many journeys throughout Siberia and Central Asia. This first journey saw him visit the Urals, the Altai Mountains in southern Siberia and the northern Kazakh Steppes. He returned briefly to Moscow in February 1848 where he married Lucy Sherrard Finley, an Englishwoman who had been a governess in a noble Russian family in St Petersburg. Two days later he set off again for Siberia, accompanied by his newly married wife. Their travels extended over 39,500 miles and occupied them until the end of 1853. His avowed aim in these expeditions was to sketch the scenery of Siberia, and he brought back over 500 clever watercolours - some of them five or six feet square - and drawings. Many were of places that were completely unknown to Europeans. He kept detailed journals of his explorations, which were written with much power and freshness.

On his return to England in 1858 he published his first book, Oriental and Western Siberia: a Narrative of Seven Years' Explorations and Adventures in Siberia, Mongolia, the Kirghis Steppes, Chinese Tartary, and part of Central Asia. A second volume appeared two years later: Travels in the Regions of the Upper and Lower Amoor and the Russian Acquisitions on the Confines of India and China. This work was highly praised by the Athenæum on its publication, although it was later suggested - after his death in 1861 - that he had used material that had previously been published in Russia in a book published by Richard Maak in St Petersburg in 1859. In fact, Atkinson fully acknowledged his debt to Maak in the foreword to the book.

Atkinson was much in demand as a speaker and in 1858 was even granted a private audience with Queen Victoria at Windsor Castle. The same year Atkinson read a paper before the British Association On the Volcanoes of Central Asia. He was also elected a fellow of the Royal Geographical Society and in 1859 a fellow of the Geological Society and the Ethnographic Society. He was also elected to membership of the exclusive Geographical Club. To the Proceedings of the RGS he contributed in 1859 a paper on a Journey through some of the highest Passes in the Ala-tu and Ac-tu Mountains in Chinese Tartary, and in the Journal of the Geological Society in 1860 he wrote On some Bronze Relics found in an Auriferous Sand in Siberia.

Through Lucy's connections to the Russian aristocracy, particularly to the Muravyev family, the Atkinsons were able to visit many of the exiled Decembrists who had been sent to Siberia by Nicholas I. These included Mattvei Muravyev-Apostol, the Bestuchev brothers and many others. Thomas had planned to write his final book about the Siberian exiles, but he died, at Lower Walmer, Kent, on 13 August 1861 before it could be started.

The seven years that Thomas and Lucy Atkinson spent travelling in Siberia and Central Asia was one of the greatest travel sagas of the nineteenth century. They visited many places that had never previously been visited by Europeans. During their first long journey together, for example, they travelled from Moscow to Barnaul in the Altai region, before heading south across the Kazakh Steppes to the Zhetysu or Semirechye region of Eastern Kazakhstan. It was here, in the small Cossack outpost of Kapal, that their son, Alatau Tamchiboulac Atkinson was born on 4 November 1848. Despite being born at the beginning of a harsh winter on the steppe, he survived.

Between September 1848 when they arrived in Kopal and September the following year when they arrived back in Barnaul, Thomas and Lucy systematically visited all the river valleys of the Djungar Alatau - becoming the first Europeans ever to visit these regions. Later they made extensive journeys in eastern Siberia, Mongolia and Djungaria.

In addition to Thomas's two books, Lucy also wrote a book: Recollections of Tartar Steppes, which is one of the earliest - and most entertaining - travel books ever written by a woman. Thomas' paintings can be found in the collections of the Victoria and Albert Museum, the Hermitage Museum in St Petersburg, the Pushkin Museum in Moscow, the V I Surikov Museum in Krasnoyarsk and in the dining room at the Royal Geographical Society in London. His descriptions of life in the Central Asia steppes are unrivalled and his paintings of the leaders of the Kazakhs at that time are unique.

Family
Thomas was twice married; first to Rebecca Mercer in 1819 and the second time, in 1848, to Lucy Finley. On 13 June 1863, two years after Thomas' death, Lucy was granted a civil list pension of £100. Thomas' son by his first wife, John William Atkinson, who died in Hamburg on 3 April 1846, aged 23, was a marine painter. Alatau, his son by Lucy, was educated at Rugby following a public subscription to pay his fees. In 1869 Alatau emigrated to Hawaii, where he became editor of the Hawaiian Gazette, director of education for the islands and later organizer of the territory's first census. He died in 1906.

References

Attribution

Architects from Yorkshire
English travel writers
1799 births
1861 deaths
People from Barnsley
Fellows of the Royal Geographical Society
English watercolourists